San Benito is a city in Cameron County, Texas, United States. Its population was 24,250 at the 2010 census. On April 3, 2007, San Benito celebrated the 100th anniversary of its naming.

The post office was named "Diaz" from April to May 1907. The San Benito Museum, Freddy Fender Museum, and Conjunto Music Museum opened in the same building on November 17, 2007.

On October 25, 1975, on the television show Hee Haw, Freddy Fender saluted his hometown of San Benito, population 15,177.

San Benito is part of the Brownsville–Harlingen–Raymondville and the Matamoros–Brownsville metropolitan areas.

History

San Benito is known as the "Resaca City". As indicated by its Spanish name, the resaca is a dry river bed. It is now the main canal of a large irrigation system.

San Benito was at first named "Diaz" in honor of Porfirio Díaz, President of Mexico at that time. The people in the San Benito area were predominantly of Mexican ancestry. The Anglo settlers came after the completion of the first irrigation system in 1906. Prior to that time, this region was an arid, mesquite- and cactus-covered wilderness. Irrigation water touched off  crop production, supported by the railroad.

On July 4, 1904, the first passenger train arrived at Diaz. To celebrate the coming of the new railroad, the community leaders renamed the railroad station "Bessie", in honor of Bessie Yoakum, whose father, Benjamin Franklin Yoakum, was instrumental in the construction of the railroad.

Some time later, when the town site was surveyed, the name was changed to "San Benito" in honor of Benjamin Hicks. He was a pioneer rancher whose charitable attitude endeared him to the population. The name was suggested by Rafael Moreno, the popular 90-year-old camp cook of the surveying party. Moreno suggested the name "San Benito" for his beloved "Saint Benjamin" Hicks.

San Benito was a village with a moderate number of homes, businesses, churches, and public schools several years before the town was incorporated in 1911. The original map of the townsite was recorded 28 April 1907. The first school was established in 1907 with 48 pupils and Miss Kate Purvis as the teacher. The post office also opened in 1907. San Benito (Benny) Montalvo was born on September 20, 1907, to Ismael and Francisca Esparza Montalvo. On the night he was born, the city of San Benito was having a celebration in honor of its new name. Upon learning of Benny's birth, Col. Sam Robertson suggested to Ismael and Francisca Montalvo to name their new son San Benito, which is how Benny got his name.

In 1927, the city adopted a commission form of government operating under a home rule charter.

In 1920, when the city was included in the U.S. Census count for the first time, San Benito had become a city of 4,070 people. By 1950, the census count expanded to 13,271. In 1960, the population had grown to 16,422. 

The irrigation district was organized in 1906. As a result of the availability of irrigation water, San Benito and all of the Lower Rio Grande Valley cities came to serve a newly developing agricultural territory.

The original townsite, created in 1911, contained .

The mild winter climate in this southmost section of Texas has played a dominant role in the growth of San Benito and the other cities of the Lower Rio Grande Valley. Crops grow and flowers bloom year-round. The city has become a hotspot for winter tourists and retired people, providing a substantial percentage of the buying power of this community.

Geography

San Benito is located west of the center of Cameron County at  (26.136603, –97.635878). Interstate 69E passes through the city, leading northwest  to Harlingen and southeast  to Brownsville.

San Benito is also known as "The Resaca City", due to its resaca (a former tributary of the Rio Grande, which has been cut off for irrigation purposes).

Climate

The climate in this area is characterized by hot, dry summers and generally warm winters.  According to the Köppen climate classification, San Benito has a semiarid, borderline tropical savannah climate, Cfa on climate maps.

Demographics

2020 census

As of the 2020 United States census, there were 24,861 people, 7,535 households, and 5,472 families residing in the city.

2000 census
As of the census of 2000, 23,444 people, 7,065 households, and 5,715 families were residing in the city. The population density was 2,130.2 people per square mile (822.1/km2). The 9,120 housing units averaged 828.7 per sq mi (319.8/km2). The racial makeup of the city was 76.16% White, 0.32% African American, 0.41% Native American, 0.25% Asian, 20.48% from other races, and 2.38% from two or more races. Hispanics or Latinos of any race were 86.93% of the population.

Of the 7,065 households,  41.4% had children under the age of 18 living with them, 56.6% were married couples living together, 19.5% had a female householder with no husband present, and 19.1% were not families. About 16.8% of all households were made up of individuals, and 10.7% had someone living alone who was 65 years of age or older. The average household size was 3.30, and the average family size was 3.72.

In the city, the age distribution was 33.3% under  18, 10.5% from 18 to 24, 24.8% from 25 to 44, 17.8% from 45 to 64, and 13.6% who were 65  or older. The median age was 30 years. For every 100 females, there were 90.2 males. For every 100 females age 18 and over, there were 84.1 males.

The median income for a household in the city was $24,027, and for a family was $26,415. Males had a median income of $22,097 versus $18,512 for females. The per capita income for the city was $10,317. About 28.7% of families and 32.7% of the population were below the poverty line, including 42.1% of those under age 18 and 22.8% of those age 65 or over.

Government
The United States Postal Service operates the San Benito Post Office.

Education
The San Benito Consolidated Independent School District serves San Benito.  The district has two high schools (Veterans Memorial Academy and San Benito High School), and three middle schools (Riverside, Berta Cabaza, and Miller Jordan).

In addition, South Texas Independent School District serves San Benito and many nearby communities by providing several magnet schools. South Texas Academy of Medical Technology (Med Tech) is located in San Benito.

San Benito Public Library is the city's library.

IDEA Public Schools also has a school in San Benito.

Notable people

 Charley Crockett, musician
 T. R. Fehrenbach, author
 Freddy Fender (born Baldemar Huerta), musician
 Charles Pugsley Fincher, cartoonist, lawyer, creator of Thadeus & Weez newspaper comic strip
 Narciso Martínez, conjunto musician
 Bobby Morrow, winner of three gold medals in the 1956 Summer Olympics 
Col. Sam A. Robertson, founder, railroad pioneer, first postmaster, World War I recipient of Distinguished Service Medal
 Charles M. Robinson III, author, history scholar
 Robert Salaburu, professional poker player, eighth place at the final table of the 2012 World Series of Poker
 Armando Torres III, a former U.S. Marine kidnapped in Mexico
 Wilma Vinsant, combat flight nurse killed over Germany

See also

La Calle Stenger

References

External links
City of San Benito official website

Assembling Piper Cubs at San Benito

Cities in Cameron County, Texas
Cities in Texas